To Get Her Together is the seventh studio album from the Dutch singer Anouk. The album was released on 20 May 2011 via the record label EMI.

Track listing
 "To Get Her Together"
 "Killer Bee"	
 "Ms. Crazy"	
 "What Have You Done"
 "Save Me"	
 "Any Younger"
 "I'm a Cliche"	
 "Down and Dirty"
 "Little Did I Know"	
 "Better Off Alone"
 "Been Here Before"

Personnel
Artwork – Prik! Media (www.prik-media.com)
Bass – Tore Johansson 
Co-producer – Anouk Teeuwe
Design [Logo] – Hotel (13) 
Drums – Peter Minorsson (tracks: 2 to 11) 
Guitar – Tore Johansson 
Keyboards – Martin Gjerstad (tracks: 1 to 7, 9 to 11) 
Management – Kees de Koning 
Mastered By – Darcy Proper 
Mixed By – Tore Johansson 
Photography By – Marc de Groot 
Photography By [Assistant] – Jip Markies, Maarten van Viegen 
Producer – Tore Johansson 
Recorded By – Tore Johansson 
Recorded By [Vocal Recording] – John Sonneveld

Tour
At the end of 2011 Anouk announced through her official website that she will be taking a hiatus from performing live. Before her hiatus she will perform 2 times at the Gelredome Stadium and 1 time at the Antwerp Arena.

Charts

Weekly charts

Year-end charts

References

2011 albums
Anouk (singer) albums